The 2004 South Lakeland District Council election took place on 10 June 2004 to elect members of South Lakeland District Council in Cumbria, England. One third of the council was up for election and the council stayed under no overall control.

After the election, the composition of the council was
Liberal Democrat 22
Conservative 20
Labour 8
Independent 2

Campaign
Before the election the Liberal Democrats had 22 seats, the Conservatives 18, Labour 8 and independents 2, with a further 2 seats being vacant. The 2 vacant seats were in Milnthorpe, after the resignation of the Liberal Democrat councillor Malcolm Alston, and Ulverston East, following the death of Labour councillor Bob Bolton. 18 seats were being contested in the 2004 election, with 6 of them being in Ulverston. Apart from the 2 vacant seats, the Conservatives defended 7 seats, the Liberal Democrats 6, Labour 2 and 1 independent.

Issues for the 3 parties represented on the council included the council tax, improving facilities, attracting more businesses to the area, street cleaning and plans to upgrade the Furness Line and create an A590 bypass. There was controversy at the election over the decision of the Liberal Democrat parliamentary candidate for Westmorland and Lonsdale Tim Farron to stand in the election for Milnthorpe. The Conservatives attacked the decision saying it was an indication the Liberal Democrats would not win the parliamentary seat, but Tim Farron said there would be no problem with him doing both roles.

The election in South Lakeland, along with all of North West England, had a trial of all postal voting.

Election result
The results saw no party win a majority, but the Conservatives made 2 gains. They took Grange-over-Sands from the Liberal Democrats by 1,129 votes to 1,054 and gained Ulverston Central from Labour by 263 votes to 226. Successful candidates included the Conservative leader of the council Colin Hodgson and the Liberal Democrat parliamentary candidate Tim Farron. Overall turnout in the election was 55.88%.

Ward results

Enid Robinson was a sitting councillor for the Lyth Valley ward.

Philip Lister was a sitting councillor for the Ulverston Town ward.

References

2004
2004 English local elections
2000s in Cumbria